David Carter "Mutt" Williams (July 31, 1892March 30, 1962) was a Major League Baseball pitcher who played with the Washington Senators in  and . He batted and threw right-handed.

External links

1892 births
1962 deaths
Major League Baseball pitchers
Baseball players from Arkansas
Washington Senators (1901–1960) players
Helena Senators players
Atlanta Crackers players
Minneapolis Millers (baseball) players
St. Joseph Saints players
Dallas Submarines players
San Antonio Bears players
Little Rock Travelers players
Fort Smith Twins players
St. Paul Saints (AA) players
Des Moines Boosters players
Denver Bears players
Springfield Midgets players
Marshall Snappers players
Marshall Indians players